The Great Waldo Search is a video game released in 1992. It is based on the third Waldo book, which was originally released under the same name in North America.

Gameplay 
The pictures are slightly animated images of Waldo scenes, the player has to scroll along the long picture to survey the scape while searching for Waldo and other objects. The directional buttons control a magnifying glass and is used in order to "find" objects. Waldo's dog Woof is also in each level and by finding him the player gets to play a small bonus game to collect points while controlling Woof on a flying carpet.

Levels
 The Carpet Flyers
 The Underground Hunters
 The Battling Monks
 The Unfriendly Giants
 The Land of Waldos

Development

Super NES credits
 Programming: William B. Norris IV
 Production: Philip Ho, Doug Braun
 Art: Wendy Salin, Mike Mangano, Kevin Kirk, Maurice Morgan, Steve Jasper, Melanie Seghetti
 Music: Doug Brandon
 Executive Producer: Howard Phillips

Legacy
Almost two decades later, in 2009, a remake of the game was developed by Ludia and published by Ubisoft on iOS, Microsoft Windows, and seventh-generation Nintendo systems, the Wii and the Nintendo DS, under the title Where's Waldo? The Fantastic Journey. The remake especially takes advantage of superior pointer-based motion controls to easily locate search targets and supports versus multiplayer. The motion controls are only included in the Wii version.

References

1992 video games
THQ games
Nintendo Entertainment System games
Super Nintendo Entertainment System games
Sega Genesis games
Video games based on Where's Waldo?
Hidden object games
Video games developed in the United States
Single-player video games